Three ships of the Royal Navy have been named HMS Fervent, with a further ship unbuilt:

 , built in 1804, was an Archer-class gunbrig, which was converted to a mooring lighter in 1816 and broken up in 1879.
 A wooden screw frigate was ordered from Woolwich Dockyard as HMS Fervent in 1846 but was cancelled in 1849.
  was a  built in 1856 and broken up in 1879.
  was a  launched in 1895 and sold for scrap in 1920.
 HMS Fervent, Royal Naval shore base and headquarters in Ramsgate, Kent, 1939–1945.

References 

Royal Navy ship names